Parochodaeus duplex is a species of sand-loving scarab beetle in the family Ochodaeidae. It is found in North America. Parochodaeus duplex males have the ability to store sperm in their Frass which can then be used to impregnate female members of the species.

References

Further reading

 

scarabaeiformia
Articles created by Qbugbot
Beetles described in 1868